Simen Omholt-Jensen (born 5 September 1995) is a Norwegian football goalkeeper who currently plays for Norwegian Premier League side Stabæk Fotball.

He joined the youth ranks of Stabæk, and then their junior team. In 2013, he was taken in as a third-choice goalkeeper of the senior team, which was then languishing in the First Division. Stabæk won promotion, but Omholt-Jensen did not play.

In 2014, their first-choice goalkeeper Sayouba Mandé was called up to the World Cup. Stabæk loaned Borger Thomas to cover for him, but in Thomas' debut match he was sent off after a mere three minutes. Omholt-Jensen played the rest of the match, which Stabæk lost 1–5. In the summer of 2014, Omholt-Jensen chose to continue his career in the American college system with the Duke Blue Devils.

References

1995 births
Living people
Sportspeople from Bærum
Norwegian footballers
Association football goalkeepers
Stabæk Fotball players
Eliteserien players
Duke Blue Devils men's soccer players
Norwegian expatriate sportspeople in the United States